Ernest William Hobson FRS (27 October 1856 – 19 April 1933) was an English mathematician, now remembered mostly for his books, some of which broke new ground in their coverage in English of topics from mathematical analysis. He was Sadleirian Professor of Pure Mathematics at the University of Cambridge from 1910 to 1931.

Life

He was born in Derby, and was educated at Derby School, the Royal School of Mines, and Christ's College, Cambridge, graduating Senior Wrangler in 1878. 
He was the brother of the economist John A. Hobson.
He became a Fellow of Christ's almost immediately after graduation. He made his way into research mathematics only gradually, becoming an expert in the theory of spherical harmonics.

His 1907 work on real analysis was something of a watershed in the British mathematical tradition; and was lauded by G. H. Hardy. It included material on general topology and Fourier series that was topical at the time; and included mistakes that were picked up later (for example by R. L. Moore).

From 1924 to 1927, Robert Pollock Gillespie studied under him.

He is buried in the Parish of the Ascension Burial Ground in Cambridge, with his wife Seline, born 25 March 1860, died 10 June 1940, by whom he had four sons, one of whom Walter William (1894 - 1930) is buried with them in the same grave.

Works

 A Treatise on Trigonometry (1891)
 Theory of Functions of a Real Variable (1907)

 Vol. I, 3rd edition (1927)
 Mathematics, from the points of view of the Mathematician and of the Physicist (1912)
 Squaring the Circle (1913)
 John Napier and the Invention of Logarithms, 1614 (1914)
 The Domain of Natural Science (1923) Gifford Lectures
 The Theory of Spherical and Ellipsoidal Harmonics (1931)

See also

Tonelli–Hobson test
Symmetry of second derivatives
Squaring the circle

References

External links

 
 
 

1856 births
1933 deaths
English mathematicians
20th-century British mathematicians
Fellows of the Royal Society
People educated at Derby School
Alumni of Christ's College, Cambridge
Royal Medal winners
Senior Wranglers
De Morgan Medallists
Fellows of Christ's College, Cambridge
People from Derby
Sadleirian Professors of Pure Mathematics